Pippi Goes on Board is a 1946 sequel to Astrid Lindgren's classic children's chapter book, Pippi Longstocking. It was followed by a further sequel Pippi in the South Seas.  It was filmed in 1969 for a TV series and edited into a film in 1969.

Pippi Longstocking
1946 children's books
Novels by Astrid Lindgren
1946 Swedish novels
Rabén & Sjögren books